Monopyle is a genus of plants in the family Gesneriaceae. 

Its native range is south-eastern Mexico to southern Tropical America. It is found in the countries of Bolivia, Brazil, Colombia, Costa Rica, Ecuador, Guatemala, Mexico, Panamá, Peru and Venezuela.

Known species
According to Kew;

References

 
Gesneriaceae genera
Taxonomy articles created by Polbot
Plants described in 1967
Flora of Mexico
Flora of Panama
Flora of Costa Rica
Flora of Guatemala
Flora of Venezuela
Flora of western South America
Flora of Brazil